Rauf Hasağası (6 August 1900 – 21 July 1992) was a Turkish sprinter. He competed in the men's 100 metres event at the 1924 Summer Olympics.

References

External links
 

1900 births
1992 deaths
Athletes (track and field) at the 1924 Summer Olympics
Turkish male sprinters
Olympic athletes of Turkey
20th-century Turkish people